Five Little Peppers in Trouble is a 1940 American black and white comedy-drama film. It was the last Five Little Peppers film.

Cast
Edith Fellows as Polly Pepper
Charles Peck as Ben Pepper
Tommy Bond as Joey Pepper
Bobby Larson as Davie Pepper
Dorothy Anne Seese as Phronsie Pepper
Pierre Watkin as Mr. King
Ronald Sinclair as Jasper
Dorothy Peterson as Mrs. Pepper
Rex Evans as Martin
Kathleen Howard as Mrs. Wilcox
Mary Currier as Mrs. Lansdowne
Helen Brown as Miss Roland
Betty Jane Graham as May
Shirley Mills as June
Shirley Jean Rickert as Kiki
Antonia Oland as Pam
Rita Quigley as Peggy
Ann Barlow as Cynthia
Don Beddoe and George McKay as Process Servers
Sue Ann Burnett as Madeline
Robert Carson as Jim
Bess Flowers as Miss Roberts
Carlton Griffin as Mr. Barnes
Eddie Laughton as Miss Wilcox's chauffeur
Billy Lechner as Tom
Judy Lynn as Betty
Freddie Mercer as Tim
Beverly Michaelson as Dorothy
Ruth Robinson as Miss Simpson
Reginald Simpson as Mr. Gorman

External links

1940 films
American black-and-white films
Columbia Pictures films
1940 comedy-drama films
Films directed by Charles Barton
American comedy-drama films
1940s English-language films
1940s American films